Clément Darbo (born 13 January 1986) is a French rugby union player. His position is scrum-half and he currently plays for Provence Rugby in the Rugby Pro D2. He began his career with Pau before moving to FC Grenoble in 2011.

References

1986 births
Living people
French rugby union players
Sportspeople from Pyrénées-Atlantiques
FC Grenoble players
Rugby union scrum-halves